Worship Music may refer to:
 Contemporary worship music, a genre of Christian music used in contemporary worship
 Worship Music (album), a 2011 album by American thrash metal band Anthrax